John Thomas Johnson (January 7, 1935 - October 16, 2006) was an American orchestral tuba player. He performed on more than 2,000 film soundtracks, most notably John Williams' Jaws score, in which he played a high-register tuba solo as the melodic theme for the shark.

Biography

Early life 
He was born in Los Angeles, California to tailor Thomas Johnson and his wife Alma, the youngest of five siblings. Johnson had a musical upbringing as his father was a baritone soloist in the choir at the Angelus Temple in Echo Park.

He attended the University of Southern California Thornton School of Music, studying under Robert Marsteller. He received a bachelor's degree in music in 1956. He played on his first film in 1958, the score for Al Capone. He went on to become Hollywood's "first-call" tuba player, playing for television commercials and television series, such as The Flintstones. In addition to Jaws, his films included, The Godfather, the Indiana Jones series, the Star Trek film series, The Lion King, Titanic, The Thin Red Line (1998 remake), The Matrix, Cats & Dogs, Forrest Gump, Air Force One, Back to the Future, A Bug's Life and Lethal Weapon.

The Jaws solo was written in an extremely high range for the tuba. In a 2004 interview with Tubanews.com, Johnson remembered being late to the recording session and opened his music to find the tuba solo. It wasn't until later that he found out it was the theme for the shark. Johnson said he asked composer John Williams why he didn't write the solo for the French horn, an instrument better suited for the register. Williams' response was, "Well, I wanted something that was in that register but I wanted it to sound a little more threatening."

Upon Johnson's death, Williams praised him as "one of the great instrumentalists of his generation. Not only was he the voice of the shark in Jaws, his performance across the full range of the repertoire inspired not only me, but a whole generation of young tubists."

In addition to his work on film soundtracks, Johnson played on recording sessions for many albums by such artists as Elvis Presley and Frank Sinatra. "Weird Al" Yankovic said Johnson was his "go-to guy" whenever he needed a tubist for his polka medleys. Johnson performed the tuba solo on Yankovic's Nirvana parody, "Smells Like Nirvana". His other recordings include Clare Fischer's Extension, The Manhattan Transfer Meets Tubby the Tuba, Partita for Brass Quintet and Tape, and Jean-Pierre Rampal Plays Scott Joplin.

Johnson performed as tuba soloist with the Los Angeles Philharmonic Orchestra, the Pasadena Symphony, the San Fernando Valley Symphony, the L.A. Pops Orchestra, the Henry Mancini Orchestra, the Hollywood Bowl Orchestra, the Academy Awards Orchestra, the USC Wind Ensemble and the Los Angeles Tuba Quartet.

He taught junior high school music in the Los Angeles Unified School District for nearly 20 years, but for most of his career, he taught advanced tuba players in private lessons and at USC and UCLA. Among his students were Norm Pearson, principal tubist of the Los Angeles Philharmonic; Alan Baer, principal tubist of the New York Philharmonic; Gene Pokorny, principal tubist of the Chicago Symphony Orchestra; Wesley Jacobs, principal tubist (Ret.) of the Detroit Symphony Orchestra; John Van Houten; Jim Self, a jazz tubist and studio musician who worked on many sessions with Johnson; and Kent Fisk, principal tubist (Ret.) of the Adelaide Symphony Orchestra and Western Australian Symphony Orchestra. Noted tubist Roger Bobo also studied under Marsteller in the 1950s, and he and Johnson became close friends and friendly competitors, playing many concerts and recording sessions together.

Personal life, memorial tribute
Johnson married Patricia Lehman (1938–2007), a Colorado-born violinist and a fellow music student from USC, in 1957. The couple had four children.

On October 16, 2006, Johnson died from complications of cancer and kidney failure at the UCLA Medical Center (now known as the Ronald Reagan UCLA Medical Center) in Los Angeles at the age of 71. He had been working until a few weeks before his death.

On December 3, 2006, a memorial concert was held at Bovard Auditorium at USC. The concert featured musical tributes by a variety of performers and culminated with the finale of Tchaikovsky's Symphony No. 4 in F Minor by a massed tuba choir of 99 tubists.

Works
<div style="float:left; width:50%;">

The Addams Family
Air Force One
Al Capone
Alien 3
Armageddon
Austin Powers: The Spy Who Shagged Me
The Babe
Back to the Future, Part II and Part III
Batman Forever
Batman Returns
Beethoven
Beethoven's 2nd
Beetlejuice
The Bodyguard
A Bug's Life
Constantine
Cars
Cats & Dogs
Chain Reaction
Close Encounters of the Third Kind
Con Air
Contact
Crimson Tide
Dances With Wolves
Death Becomes Her
Deep Rising
Die Hard
Die Hard 2
Dracula
The Edge
Edward Scissorhands
Enemy of the State
Evolution
Executive Decision
Extreme Measures
Father of the Bride Part II
A Few Good Men
First Wives Club
The Flintstones
Flubber
Forrest Gump
Frequency
The Frighteners
The General's Daughter
The Godfather, Part II and Part III
Godzilla
Grumpier Old Men
The Haunting
Honey
Honeymoon in Vegas
The Incredibles
Independence Day
Indiana Jones and the Last Crusade
Instinct
Jaws
Jaws 2
Jaws 3-D
Jaws: The Revenge
The Karate Kid
The Karate Kid Part II
The Karate Kid Part III
King Kong (1976)
The Last of the Mohicans
A League of Their Own
Lethal Weapon
Lethal Weapon 2
Lethal Weapon 3
Lethal Weapon 4

</div style="float:right; width:50%;">
Logan's Run
The Lion King
The Matrix, The Matrix Reloaded and The Matrix Revolutions
Maverick
Men in Black
Monsters, Inc.
MouseHunt
Mr. Magoo
Mulan
Mystery, Alaska
National Lampoon's Christmas Vacation
The Natural
The Nightmare Before Christmas
The Nutty Professor
The Odd Couple II
The Parent Trap
Planet of the Apes
Pleasantville
Pocahontas
Police Academy
Police Academy 2: Their First Assignment
Police Academy 3: Back in Training
Police Academy 4: Citizens on Patrol
Police Academy 5: Assignment Miami Beach
The Quick and the Dead
The Rainmaker
Reindeer Games
Richie Rich
Robin Hood
 Roots 
Scream 2
Scream 3
Seven
Silverado
Small Soldiers
Snow Day
Starship Troopers
Star Trek: The Motion Picture
Star Trek II: The Wrath of Khan
Star Trek III: The Search for Spock
Star Trek IV: The Voyage Home
Star Trek V: The Final Frontier
Star Trek VI: The Undiscovered Country
Star Trek: Insurrection
Star Trek: Nemesis
Tarzan
The Thin Red Line
The Thomas Crown Affair
The Tigger Movie
The Towering Inferno
Tin Cup
Titanic
Toy Story
Toy Story 2
True Lies
Twister
U-571
Under Siege
Under Siege 2: Dark Territory
Unforgiven
US Marshals
Waiting to Exhale
The Waterboy
Waterworld
Wild Wild West
Wyatt Earp

References
 Noland, Claire. October 25, 2006. Tommy Johnson, 71; noted tuba player's movie work boosted the tension in 'Jaws', Los Angeles Times (retrieved from registration-only site on December 2, 2006).
 In memoriam, UCLA Today Online (retrieved on December 2, 2006).
Booth, William. December 5, 2006. "A 99-Tuba Salute", The Washington Post (retrieved on December 6, 2006).

Notes

External links
 
  Wind Song Press
 TommyJohnsonTuba.com
 

1935 births
2006 deaths
20th-century African-American people
20th-century African-American musicians
21st-century African-American musicians
20th-century American musicians
21st-century American musicians
20th-century classical musicians
21st-century classical musicians
American classical tubists
American session musicians
American music educators
Deaths from cancer in California
Musicians from Los Angeles
Deaths from kidney failure
USC Thornton School of Music alumni
USC Thornton School of Music faculty
UCLA Herb Alpert School of Music faculty
Classical musicians from California